Arenga pinnata (syn. Arenga saccharifera) is an economically important feather palm native to tropical Asia, from eastern India east to Malaysia, Indonesia, and the Philippines in the east. Common names include sugar palm, areng palm (also aren palm or arengga palm), black sugar palm, and kaong palm, among other names.

Description
The fruit is subglobose,  diameter, green maturing black.

Ecology
A. pinnata suffers from the Red Palm Weevil, Rhynchophorus ferrugineus. A. pinnata is one of the major hosts for R. ferrugineus in China.

It is not a threatened species, though it is locally rare in some parts of its range. It serves as an important part of the diet of several endangered species, including cloud rats of the genus Phloeomys.

Uses
for high grade construction, posts, beams, faters, flooring, interior finish, wharf bridge building and other uses where strength and durability are important.

Sap
The sap is harvested for commercial use in southeast Asia, yielding a sugar known in India as gur or in Indonesia as gula aren. The sap is collected and made as lahang, a traditional cold sweet drink, and is also fermented into vinegar (Filipino sukang kaong), palm wine (Filipino tubâ, Malaysian and Indonesian tuak, in eastern Indonesia sageru), which in turn is distilled into a spirit (sopi in Maluku, cap tikus in  North Sulawesi).

Edmund Roberts talks about drinking an alcoholic beverage made in the Cavite area. He described it as a "fermented" and "intoxicating liquor". He said that it was "the pith furnished with sugar – when the liquor was properly boiled down, a farina...and of the inside of its triangular-shaped fruit a sweetbread was made."

Sugar (jaggery) is also commonly derived from the fresh sap in Indonesia and the Philippines. These are traditionally prevented from fermenting by placing crushed chili or ginger in the collecting container. The sap is boiled until it reduces to a thick syrup which is then dried into a brown sugar. Similar sugar extraction methods are also traditionally used for other sugar palms, like the buri palm (Corypha elata).

The raw juice and pulp are caustic. This crop may develop into a major resource of biofuel (ethanol).

Fruit
The immature fruits are widely consumed in the Philippines (called kaong) and Indonesia (called buah kolang-kaling or buah tap) and are made into canned fruits after they are boiled in sugar syrup.

Fibres

According to the study on bas-reliefs of Javanese ancient temples such as Borobudur, this type of roof are known in ancient Java vernacular architecture. It can be found today in Balinese temple roof architecture and Minangkabau Rumah Gadang gonjong horn-like curved roof architecture, such as those found in Pagaruyung Palace.

Leaves
The leaves as well as the leaf midribs can be used to weave baskets and marquetry work in furniture.

Starch
In Indonesia, starch can also be extracted from sugar palms and used in place of rice flour in noodles, cakes, and other dishes.

Survival food 
The seeds can be boiled and the stem tips can be eaten as vegetables. The young flower stalks can be bruised to obtain the juice.

Culture
In the Philippines, an annual Irok Festival is celebrated in the municipality of Indang in Cavite which is a major producer of kaong fruits, sukang kaong, and tubâ in the country. Irok is a local name for Arenga pinnata in the northwestern Philippines.

According to Sundanese folklore, the spirit known as Wewe Gombel dwells in the Arenga pinnata palm, where she also has her nest and keeps the children she abducts.

Gallery

References

External links

Kew Palms Checklist: Arenga pinnata
Global Compendium of Weeds: Arenga pinnata
PACSOA: Arenga pinnata
 "Sugar palm" entry at Bioenergy Wiki

pinnata
Tropical fruit